Fedotov (Федотов) or Fedotova (feminine) is a common Russian last name from the given name Fedot, borrowed from  "given by God". Belarusian form is Фядотаў. It may refer to the following people:

Association football players
Denis Fedotov (born 1977)
Gleb Fedotov (born 1995)
Grigory Fedotov  (1916-1957)
Renāte Fedotova (born 1996)
Semyon Fedotov (born 1992)
Sergei Fedotov (disambiguation), several people
Vitaliy Fedotov (born 1991)
Vladimir Fedotov, several people
Vladislav Fedotov (born 1997)
Yevgeni Fedotov (born 1976)

Others
Aleksandr Fedotov (1941–1995), Russian actor and dramatist
Aleksandr Vasilyevich Fedotov (1932–1984), Soviet test pilot and Hero of the Soviet Union 
Anastasia Fedotova (born 1998), Russian water polo player
Anatoli Fedotov (born 1966), Russian ice hockey player
Georgy Fedotov, Russian religious thinker, historian and publicist
Glikeriya Fedotova (1846-1925), Russian actress
Irina Fedotova (born 1975), Russian rower
Ivan Fedotov (born 1996), Russian ice hockey goaltender
Lyudmila Fedotova (born 1986), Kazakhstani skier
Maria Fedotova-Nulgynet  (born 1946), Russian Evenk poet, children's writer, and storyteller
Nadezhda Glyzina-Fedotova (born 1988), Russian water polo player
Maxim Fedotov (born 1961), Russian violinist
Pavel Fedotov (1815–1852), Russian painter
Pyotr Fedotov (1900–1963), Soviet security and intelligence officer
Vasily Fedotov (1915–1997), major general of the Soviet Army
Yury Fedotov (1947–2022), Russian Ambassador to the United Kingdom

References

Russian-language surnames